Emílio Manuel Delgado Peixe (born 16 January 1973) is a Portuguese former footballer who played mainly as a defensive midfielder, currently manager of the Kuwait under-23 team.

A member of the dubbed Golden Generation who hailed from the Portugal youth teams, he was one of the few to have represented all three major clubs in the country, Sporting CP, Porto and Benfica.

Over the course of 14 seasons, Peixe amassed Primeira Liga totals of 172 games and four goals. In 2008, he started working as a manager.

Playing career
Born in Nazaré, Peixe emerged from Sporting CP's prolific youth ranks, making his first-team debut shortly after another club great, Luís Figo. In the summer of 1991, already firmly established in the starting XI, he was essential in helping the Portuguese under-20s to win the FIFA World Cup in Lisbon, where he also received the Golden Ball.

After helping Sporting, with Figo, to conquer the 1995 Taça de Portugal, Peixe moved abroad to Sevilla FC, accompanying coach Toni. However, grossly unsettled, he left in the immediate winter transfer window, returning to the Lions but never regaining his previous form.

Peixe then played five seasons at FC Porto, with a six-month loan spell with F.C. Alverca in between. He retired in June 2004, after unassuming one-season stints with S.L. Benfica and U.D. Leiria.

Also internationally, Peixe earned 12 caps with the full side, all between 18 and 20 years old. He also helped Portugal to a fourth-place finish at the 1996 Summer Olympics.

Coaching career
Peixe returned to the national team in 2008, being charged with coaching the under-16s. In the following years he worked with several of its youth sides, as both head and assistant manager.

Both Peixe and Rui Bento left the Portuguese Football Federation set-up in August 2022, to take the helm at Kuwait's Olympic and senior teams, respectively.

Honours
Sporting CP
Taça de Portugal: 1994–95
Supertaça Cândido de Oliveira: 1995

Porto
Primeira Liga: 1997–98, 1998–99
Taça de Portugal: 1999–00, 2000–01
Supertaça Cândido de Oliveira: 1999

Portugal
FIFA U-20 World Cup: 1991
UEFA European Under-16 Championship: 1989
FIFA U-16 World Cup third place: 1989
UEFA Under-18 Championship runner-up: 1990

Individual
FIFA U-20 World Cup Golden Ball: 1991

References

External links

1973 births
Living people
People from Nazaré, Portugal
Sportspeople from Leiria District
Portuguese footballers
Association football midfielders
Primeira Liga players
Sporting CP footballers
FC Porto players
F.C. Alverca players
S.L. Benfica footballers
U.D. Leiria players
La Liga players
Sevilla FC players
Portugal youth international footballers
Portugal under-21 international footballers
Portugal international footballers
Footballers at the 1996 Summer Olympics
Olympic footballers of Portugal
Portuguese expatriate footballers
Expatriate footballers in Spain
Portuguese expatriate sportspeople in Spain
Portuguese football managers
Portuguese expatriate football managers
Expatriate football managers in Kuwait
Portuguese expatriate sportspeople in Kuwait